Kevin Richard "K. J." Costello (born June 7, 1997) is an American football quarterback for the Philadelphia Stars of the United States Football League (USFL). He played college football for the Stanford Cardinal and the Mississippi State Bulldogs.

Early years
Costello attended Santa Margarita Catholic High School in Rancho Santa Margarita, California. During his high school football career, he passed for a school record 8,222 yards, surpassing a record previously held by Carson Palmer and 62 passing touchdowns.  Rated as one of the top quarterback recruits in his class, Costello committed to Stanford University to play college football.

College career
Costello redshirted his first year at Stanford in 2016. He entered 2017 as a backup to Keller Chryst, but made his first career start against UCLA after Chryst was injured. Costello returned as the backup after the game; however, he took over as the starter prior to the eighth game of the season. He remained the starter throughout the rest of the season and finished with 1,573 passing yards, 14 touchdowns and four interceptions and took the Cardinal to the Pac-12 Championship game. 

KJ Costello started 35 games in College football. He holds the SEC Single-Game passing record with 623 yards against the defending national champions, LSU Tigers. He passed Andrew Luck & John Elway for all-time on the list for most passing yards in a single season at Stanford with 3540 yards. 

On December 18, 2019, Costello entered the transfer portal as a graduate transfer. On February 3, 2020, Costello announced he would be grad transferring to Mississippi State.
 
Costello made his first start for Mississippi State on September 26, 2020, where he broke the SEC record for passing yards in a single game with 623 yards in a 44–34 victory over the defending national champion, LSU.

Statistics

Professional career

Los Angeles Chargers
On August 1, 2021, Costello signed with the Los Angeles Chargers after going undrafted in the 2021 NFL Draft. He was waived on August 17.

Philadelphia Stars
Costello signed with the Philadelphia Stars of the United States Football League on May 27, 2022.

New Orleans Saints
On August 10, 2022, Costello signed with the New Orleans Saints. He was waived on August 21, 2022.

Philadelphia Stars (second stint)
On February 17, 2023, Costello re-signed with the Philadelphia Stars.

Career statistics

References

External links
Mississippi State Bulldogs bio
Stanford Cardinal bio

1997 births
Living people
Sportspeople from Newport Beach, California
Players of American football from California
American football quarterbacks
Stanford Cardinal football players
Mississippi State Bulldogs football players
Los Angeles Chargers players
Philadelphia Stars (2022) players
New Orleans Saints players